FWICE may refer to:

Federation of Western India Cine Employees, a trade union.
 fwice is a command to test firewall filter rules in an IBM firewall for AIX.